Minister for Industry and Commerce may refer to:
 Minister of Commerce and Industries (Afghanistan)
 State Administration for Industry and Commerce, PR China
 Minister of Commerce and Industry (France)
 Minister for Enterprise, Trade and Employment, Ireland ("Minister for Industry and Commerce" 1922–1981, 1986–1993)
 Ministry of Commerce and Industry (India)
 Minister of Industry and Commerce (Manitoba)
 Ministry of Industry and Commerce (Turkey)
 Ministry of Industry and Commerce (Zimbabwe)

See also
 Industry minister
 Commerce minister